Sudirman Central Business District or SCBD is a business district with an integrated mixed use development concept, located in South Jakarta, Indonesia, consisting of condominiums, office buildings, hotels, shopping and entertainment centers. The total area of SCBD is about 45 hectares, which is again divided into 25 lots. About 13 hectares of the district are used to develop road network and landscaping. SCBD is located within the Golden Triangle of Jakarta. There are seven entry and exit points from SCBD to different avenues of Jakarta. Most of the office buildings in the district are connected by underground pedestrian links.

Important buildings

As of September 2022, the third tallest building in Jakarta, Treasury Tower is located in the district. Jakarta Signature Tower, which is under proposal, once completed it will be the 5th tallest building in the world, is located in the district. (although it may be potentially canceled)

Important buildings in this district are:  

Treasury Tower
Pacific Place Jakarta
Equity Tower
The Energy
District 8
Indonesia Stock Exchange
Alila SCBD
PCPD Tower
 Head office of CitiBank Indonesia
 Heaf office of FWD
Sequis Centre Tower
SCBD Suites
Artha Graha Tower
 Embassies of
  (9th floor)
  (25th floor)
 Capital Residence
 Kusuma Chandra
 JAK TV Building

Transportation

SCBD is served by TransJakarta Corridor 1 and Corridor 9. Other bus service providers such as Kopaja, Mayasari Bakti and APTB buses also serves the SCBD. Those bus routes passes through main avenues surrounding the district and connect the district with other parts of the city. SCBD is also  integrated with Istora Mandiri Station of the Jakarta MRT on Jalan Jenderal Sudirman. During busy hours, free shuttle buses are available to move within the district at 8-10 minutes interval. A tunnel near the Istora Mandiri MRT station connecting the Pacific Place Mall, the Indonesia Stock Exchange building and the pedestrian sidewalk.

Here are the list of transportation services that serves the SCBD:

Bus Routes

TransJakarta 

 Corridor  at:
 Polda Metro Jaya
 Corridor  (3F)  (10H) at:
 Gelora Bung Karno
 Corridor      (9K) (13C) at:
 Semanggi 
 Gatot Subroto LIPI (temporarily closed for renovation since September 4, 2022)

Train Lines 
North–South Line of the Jakarta MRT  with two stations:
 Senayan
 Istora Mandiri

See also

List of tallest buildings in Indonesia
List of tallest buildings in Jakarta
List of tallest buildings in Asia
Central business district

References

Central business districts in Indonesia
Buildings and structures in Jakarta
Post-independence architecture of Indonesia
Skyscraper office buildings in Indonesia
Skyscraper hotels
South Jakarta